Garudinodes trizona is a moth of the family Erebidae. It was described by George Hampson in 1911. It is found in Papua New Guinea.

References

 

Nudariina
Moths described in 1911